BikeAthens is a transportation choices organization based in Athens, Georgia.  It is incorporated as, and originally known as, the Athens/Clarke Safe Cycling Association.  BikeAthens is an affiliate group of Common Ground Athens.

Mission

The mission of BikeAthens is:
BikeAthens promotes transportation and land-use policies that improve alternative modes of transportation, including pedestrian, cycling, and public transit options. The mission of our organization is to make alternative transportation a practical, convenient, and safe option for all citizens of Athens-Clarke County.

Programs

 Bike Education: Through bike education workshops and courteous mass rides, BikeAthens works to develop safe, knowledgeable cyclists.
 Advocacy:  BikeAthens has been active in promoting the placement of bike lanes and other measures for safe cycling in Athens.
 Bike Recycling: The bike recycling program repairs donated or police impound bikes and distributes them through partnerships with local social service agencies.
 Athens Clarke County Bike Map: First published in 2005, with updated editions in 2007 and 2010, the bike map displays streets rated for motor vehicle traffic, presence of bike lanes, and topography.

References

External links
 BikeAthens website

Non-profit organizations based in Georgia (U.S. state)
Cycling organizations
Transportation in Athens, Georgia